Denis Ring (28 October 1897 – 26 May 1977) was an Irish hurler who played for Cork Senior Championship club St Finbarr's. He also had a brief career with the Cork senior hurling team, with whom he was an All-Ireland Championship runner-up alongside his brother Dannix in 1920.

Honours
St Finbarr's
Cork Senior Hurling Championship (4): 1919, 1922, 1923, 1926

Cork
Munster Senior Hurling Championship (1): 1920

References

1897 births
1977 deaths
St Finbarr's hurlers
Cork inter-county hurlers